Luozi Territory is an administrative area in Kongo Central province of the Democratic Republic of the Congo. The headquarters are in the city of Luozi.
The Luozi territory is also known as the Manianga.

Overview
The territory is divided into sectors: Kinkenge, Mbanza-Mwembe, Mbanza Mona, Mbanza Ngoyo, Mongo Luala, Kimumba, Kenge, Kimbanza, Kivunda and Balari. It extends north from the Congo River, and is bordered by the Republic of the Congo to the north.
The town of Luozi lies on the north bank of Congo River.

As of 2002 the territory had a population of 192,004.

The economy is mainly agricultural, with women working the fields and men engaged in hunting, fishing, forestry, construction and furniture-making. Products include cassava, peanuts and corn, fruits such as avocado, pineapple, guava, sugar cane, mango, lemon and mandarin orange, coffee, pumpkins, oil palm and a wide variety of vegetables. 
There are some minerals including gold, diamonds, copper and iron but these have not been exploited.

References

Territories of Kongo Central Province

fr:Luozi